The Comando Interforze per le Operazioni Cibernetiche (English: Inter-force command for cybernetic operations, known as CIOC) is the Italian service of the Ministry of Defense. It covers cybersecurity. It was established in 2017 (protocol active since 16 February 2016), to protect the  Italian network from cybercriminals, and attack other networks in case of necessity.

CIOC has the mandate to  guarantee the OODA cycle (Observe, Orient, Decide, Act).

In 2020 he was absorbed by the Network Operations Command.

See also
 List of cyber warfare forces

References 

Military communications of Italy
Government agencies established in 2017
2017 establishments in Italy